iSheriff (formerly Internet Sheriff) is an Internet security software vendor that specializes in cloud-based security and compliance, with specialties in E-mail filtering, Web filters and endpoint security. The company is privately held and based in Redwood City, California. iSheriff sells their products through partners and distributors.

History
Founded in Brisbane, Australia in 1999 by Oscar Marquez, iSheriff products focused on content filtering, email and Web filtering software and appliances. In 2009 the company moved its products to a cloud computing service model. 
iSheriff services include e-mail filtering, web filtering, email archiving, e-mail encryption and security reporting. The company holds a patent for its data modeling engine based on Bayesian spam filtering principals.

In 2006, iSheriff provided Internet filtering software to the Tasmanian government's first statewide trial of anti-pornography filters for children.

In July 2012, Total Defense, Inc., a provider of cybercrime-fighting technology, announced they had acquired iSheriff.
On April 21, 2014, Total Defense announced that, in conjunction with the sale of their consumer business unit to Untangle, they re-branded as iSheriff.

iSheriff’s Cloud Security Suite

Email Security and Archiving – Cloud-based anti-spam, email security and email archiving, removing incoming email of spam, providing a clean email connection which secures against viruses, unwanted content and data leakage, as well as cloud-based archiving.

Web security – Cloud-based content and malware filtering, providing secure internet browsing, enforcement of acceptable use policies and data leak protection.

Endpoint security – Cloud-based platform with a multi-layer anti-malware approach that protects from malware, secures & controls applications being used by end users and protects against threats from removable media.

References

External links
Corporate website

Software companies based in the San Francisco Bay Area
Computer security software companies
Companies based in Redwood City, California
Software companies established in 1999
Content-control software
Defunct software companies of the United States
1999 establishments in California